Bryosphaeria is a genus of fungi in the class Dothideomycetes. The relationship of this taxon to other taxa within the class is unknown (incertae sedis).

Species
Bryosphaeria brevicollis
Bryosphaeria bryophila
Bryosphaeria cinclidoti
Bryosphaeria echinoidea
Bryosphaeria epibrya
Bryosphaeria megaspora
Bryosphaeria pohliae
Bryosphaeria quinqueseptata
Bryosphaeria setifera

See also 
 List of Dothideomycetes genera incertae sedis

References

External links 
 Bryosphaeria at Index Fungorum

Dothideomycetes enigmatic taxa
Dothideomycetes genera